Quarry Hangers is a  biological Site of Special Scientific Interest south-west of Caterham in Surrey.

This sloping site on the North Downs has species-rich chalk grassland, woodland and scrub. Heavily grazed areas are dominated by red fescue and sheep’s fescue, with flowering plants including horseshoe vetch, bird’s-foot trefoil and wild thyme. There is a taller sward in less grazed areas, with grasses such as upright brome and wood false-brome.

References

Surrey Wildlife Trust
Sites of Special Scientific Interest in Surrey